The England cricket team toured South Africa during the 1930–31 season, playing five Test matches against the South Africa national team and 15 tour matches (11 first-class under the banner of the Marylebone Cricket Club against local sides. The tour began on 8 November 1930 with a match against Western Province and ended on 10 March 1931 at the conclusion of another match against the same side. The five Tests were played between 24 December 1930 and 25 February 1931. The Test series was won 1–0 by South Africa, who won the first Test, with the remaining four being drawn.

Test series

1st Test

2nd Test

3rd Test

4th Test

5th Test

References

External links
Marylebone Cricket Club in South Africa 1930-31 at CricketArchive

1930-31
International cricket competitions from 1918–19 to 1945
South African cricket seasons from 1918–19 to 1944–45